Cabdullahi Macallin Axmed, Dhoodaan (Born 1941 in Doollo zone Dead April 2013) was Somali poet.

 
A well-known Somali poet Abdullahi Moalin Ahmed “Dhoodaan” died at age of 72 in the city of Harar. He was one of the pioneers of Somali poetry and arguably one of the greatest poet of the last century. He was born within a family of shepherds from the Somaali Galbeed , he could not have a formal education.

Early life 
Born to a nomadic pastoralist family, he had what could have been speech and language delay disorder at an early age. Young Dhoodaan during those years was a very shy, quiet, and observant child, many thought he will never speak again. Not surprising for a nomadic society that had little knowledge of disorders or its diagnosis techniques. Little did they know what was boiling under his prolonged silence and like a volcano he erupted. What followed was a miracle, not only was he able to speak but was able to do so flawlessly through poetry. He spoke elegantly and with ease, unusual for a child, yet what people didn't understand was where he acquired such a skill.

Poetry did not run in his blood line, in fact none of his family history was known for poetry. But because he didn't have the ability to speak at an early age, he compensated it through observation. He made sense of his surroundings by silently constructing words in his mind. This would later become poetry, and through this poetry he would later speak about the issues facing his community; whether it was famine, war or love. He did not shy away from challenging the status quo, and the leaders of his community. From that point, it was clear that he was not an ordinary young boy, but a legend in the making.

Cultural impact 
Dhoodaan was from the Somali region  ( Somaali Galbeed ) and just like many others he fled the conflict in Ethiopia and moved to Somalia. It was no surprise that he immediately challenged and spoke critically against the authoritarian regime of Dictator Mohamed Siad Barre in his newly adopted country. After the failure of the 1977 Ogaden War, he openly criticized and condemned the Barre regime for turning the war into a border issue and a disputed territory between Somalia and Ethiopia. He was famously known for his support of the movements for the secession of Somaali galbeed, as was depicted in many of his poems.

Poems of Dhoodaan 
When dealing with weighty social and historical circumstances, Abdillahi Dhodan’s command of Somali language and poetic insight is in the same league as the legendary poets, such as Ragge Ugas and Qamaan Bulhan.
Abdullahi Maalim Dhoodaan is the first Somali poet in the past and present. In my opinion, apart from Sayid Mohamed Abdille Hassan, I do not think there is anyone as creative as Abdullahi Dhoodaan. It can be said that he reached the highest point in the standard of poetry. He is also an expert on Somali culture and language, the history of our nation and the horns of Africa. In addition, there is a sense of patriotism and hatred of colonialism and aggression. He was one of the founders of the Nasru-Laahi party. The party was an independent movement in the western Somali region. Despite the differences in speed and pace, the last half century has been relentlessly engaged in this struggle.

Abdullahi Dhoodaan's poems can each be written in books only. Each of the poets' poems is characterized by ingenuity, eloquence, vocabulary, ingenuity, meaning and unsurpassed complexity. His passion is new, and his wisdom is here, as he said to himself: a poem that I create if it seems to me, I want a new place to be.
Every time you listen to or read a poem that he has recited, you think that the equivalent of a poem has never been recited. But if you sit down and listen to the next poem on the same band, you easily forget the one you listened to a few minutes ago and admit that the latter is the heaviest song you have ever heard. It's not because you, the listener, have a bad choice or are unfamiliar with poetry sorting. The reason for this is probably Dhoodaan's poems, which are heavier than each other and are more sophisticated and scientific and difficult to prioritize. Each man has his own preferences and interests for poetry.

It can be argued that 100% of Dhoodaan's poems are patriotic. It is possible to find someone who does not agree with the political position or how he or she measured a certain political situation at a certain time. But I have never seen or heard of anyone criticizing his incomparable, unfathomable power, the power of which can be said to be the intellectual power of poetry. You see no meris in Abdullahi Dhoodaan and you wonder who will change you or why he said it and did not say the same thing.
In addition, he has a variety of voices and rhymes that are unique to him and that make listening to Somalis very appealing. The way he sings and the sound of his poems is indescribable and only he can accomplish it. Listen: Who sent, Salleelo, Garnaqsi, Agardarro, Xaajadii, ETc. Singing poetry, especially when it is as pure as Dhoodaan, has a special value and significance because one often sees that a man is a good poet and if his poem is written, it can be tasted of wisdom. But when he sings, it does not taste so good.

References

1941 births
Somalian poets
2013 deaths
Ethiopian emigrants to Somalia
20th-century poets
21st-century poets

{Somali-writer-stub}}